The 2009 World Orienteering Championships, the 26th World Orienteering Championships, were held in Miskolc, Hungary, 16–23 August 2009.

The championships had eight events; sprint for men and women, middle distance for men and women, long distance (formerly called individual or classic distance) for men and women, and relays for men and women.

Medalists

2009 WOC injury 

An incident occurred during the last leg of the men's relay which involved four of the leading teams. Sweden's Martin Johansson got seriously injured, and three of the other runners stopped for helping, calling for an ambulance and carrying him out of the wood.

References 

World Orienteering Championships
2009 in Hungarian sport
International sports competitions hosted by Hungary
August 2009 sports events in Europe
Orienteering in Europe
Sport in Miskolc